Lacave is the name of 2 communes in France:
 nhusa mu
 Lacave, Ariège, in the Ariège department
 Lacave, Lot, in the Lot department